Alunul River may refer to the following rivers in Romania:

 Alunul, a tributary of the Cracăul Alb in Neamț County
 Alunul, a tributary of the Nechit in Neamț County
 Alunul, a tributary of the Sadu in Gorj County

See also
 Aluna River, a tributary of the river Șușița in Romania
 Aluniș River (disambiguation)
 Alunișu River (disambiguation)